The women's half marathon event at the 2017 Summer Universiade was held on 27 August at the Taipei Municipal Stadium.

Medalists

Individual

Team

Results

Individual

Team

References

Half
2017